James Truman may refer to:

 James S. Truman (1874–1957), American lawyer and politician from New York
 James W. Truman, American chronobiologist